Geoffrey the Grammarian (fl. 1440) (in Latin: Galfridus Grammaticus) was an English medieval monk and grammarian who wrote several treatises.  Geoffrey was originally from Norfolk, England.  In the late 15th century, he published the Thesaurus Linguae Romanae et Britannicae, which was the first English-to-Latin wordbook.  The Promptorium parvulorum also is attributed to Geoffrey.

References

External links
 Oxford Dictionary of National Biography

Grammarians from England
15th-century English people

Year of birth unknown
Year of death unknown